Tobias Zellner (born 11 September 1977 in Deggendorf) is a former German footballer.

Zellner made one appearance in each the Fußball-Bundesliga and the 2. Bundesliga as well as a further 90 3. Liga games during his playing career.

Zellner was elected to the board of directors of SSV Jahn Regensburg in July 2011.

References

External links 
 

1977 births
Living people
People from Deggendorf (district)
Sportspeople from Lower Bavaria
German footballers
Association football midfielders
Bundesliga players
2. Bundesliga players
3. Liga players
1. FC Nürnberg players
Carlisle United F.C. players
SSV Jahn Regensburg players
Footballers from Bavaria
FK Pirmasens players